Sérgio Rodrigues may refer to:

 Sérgio Rodrigues (swimmer) (born 1930), Brazilian freestyle swimmer and water polo player
 Sérgio Rodrigues (architect) (1927–2014), Brazilian architect and designer
 Sérgio Rodrigues (author) (born 1962), Brazilian author, literary critic and journalist